Charaxes chintechi is a butterfly in the family Nymphalidae. It is found in south-western Tanzania, eastern Zambia, northern Malawi and Mozambique. The habitat consists of Brachystegia woodland (Miombo)

The larvae feed on Brachystegia spiciformis and Dalbergia lactea.

Taxonomy
Charaxes chintechi is a member of the large species group Charaxes etheocles
The male is very similar to both Charaxes manica and Charaxes howarthi

References

External links
Charaxes chintechi images at Charaxes page Consortium for the Barcode of Life subspecies and forms
Images of C. chintechi Royal Museum for Central Africa (Albertine Rift Project)
African Butterfly Database Range map via search
African Charaxes/Charaxes Africains Eric Vingerhoedt 

Butterflies described in 1975
chintechi